

Blak Douglas, formerly known as Adam Douglas Hill, is an Australian artist and musician.  he is based in Sydney, New South Wales. He is a Dunghatti man.

Artwork
Douglas was a finalist for the Archibald Prize in 2015 (Smoke and mirrors – Uncle Max Eulo) and 2018 (Uncle Roy Kennedy).

He won the 2022 Archibald Prize for his portrait of Wiradjuri artist Karla Dickens.

Recognition
A portrait of Douglas by Euan Macleod was finalist for the 2021 Archibald Prize. He is an Indigenous Australian (Dhungatti) with Irish, Scots, English, German ancestry.

His work is held in the National Gallery of Australia and the Art Gallery of New South Wales.

References

External links

Living people
Artists from Sydney
Indigenous Australian artists
Archibald Prize winners
1970 births